Room and Bird is a 1951 Warner Bros. Merrie Melodies animated short directed by Friz Freleng. The short was released on June 2, 1951, and stars Tweety and Sylvester.

Plot
Two elderly ladies (one of which is Granny), the owners of Sylvester and Tweety, sneak their pets into a hotel where no pets are allowed. Sylvester, hearing Tweety's singing in the room next to his, writes a letter to the canary from his "Ardent Admirer". Tweety shortly discovers who his "admirer" is, and a chase ensues, which is cut short by the security guard, forcing both Tweety and Sylvester to run back into their rooms and the latter to disguise himself (as a lady in bed screaming for help from the policemen) causing the security guard after he entered his room without knocking to apologize and flee.

Sylvester then sneaks into Tweety's room and tries to get him in his cage; this backfires and he is knocked out by the spring-loaded cage and is dragged back to his room by Tweety. Sylvester then phones Tweety that his owner has a surprise for him; Tweety goes downstairs to receive it, but instead goes down Sylvester's throat, returning with a mouse from the time of Thomas Jefferson, explaining he is dead. The chase then goes outside, and into the room of Hector (how his owner got him past the doorman is unknown). Sylvester doesn't realize until after he's captured Tweety again that the dog is there. Another chase ensues, involving dog, cat and bird, which is also cut short by the security guard, forcing the three to form a truce long enough to disguise themselves (as an angry old lady with Tweety's head). The chase resumes again with the three animals running from room to room, making the security guard suspicious. Finally, the cat and dog’s noises are heard behind a door (or he sees the two off-screen), prompting the frustrated security guard to finally head back to the lobby and make an announcement over the intercom evicting all pets. Unfortunately, a veritable zoo calls the hotel home, and comes stampeding over him (although it’s possible that Sylvester and Hector were with the animals, but unseen through cloud of dust they made).

Getting up, the security guard dizzily says Tweety's catch phrase: "I tawt I taw a putty tat!" Tweety, popping out of hiding, delivers the final punchline by replying, "You did! You did! You taw a putty tat, a moo-moo tow, a big dowiwwa, a diddy-up hortey, and a wittle monkey!" (A busker's monkey was the last animal to run over the doorman)

References

External links

 
 

1951 films
1951 short films
1951 comedy films
1951 animated films
1950s English-language films
1950s Warner Bros. animated short films
American animated short films
American slapstick comedy films
Merrie Melodies short films
Sylvester the Cat films
Tweety films
Animated films about dogs
Films about mice and rats
Films about pets
Cultural depictions of Thomas Jefferson
Animated films set in New York (state)
Animated films set in New York City
Films set in hotels
Films set in 1951
Short films directed by Friz Freleng
Films scored by Eugene Poddany
Warner Bros. Cartoons animated short films